Inside is a 2011 American social horror thriller film brought to viewers through a partnership between Intel and Toshiba.

Directed and written by D. J. Caruso and starring Emmy Rossum, the experience is broken up into several segments across multiple social media platforms, including Facebook, YouTube, and Twitter. Viewers are challenged to help Rossum's character, Christina, to safely escape her predicament. The film bears some similarities to the non-social 2008 film Untraceable in that it involves kidnapping and an Internet audience as part of the plot.

The first in a series of episodes was released on the website on July 25, 2011 for those participating in the "real-time experience". The whole film became available for online viewing on September 6, 2011 on their website, though both the website and YouTube channel no longer exist.

Plot 
Twenty-four-year-old Christina Perasso, a tough, resilient girl, wakes up trapped in a room and has no idea where she is being held or who did this to her. She has been left access to her laptop. Through the use of an intermittent Wi-Fi signal, she reaches out to friends, family and an audience through social media. She lists facts, clues, pictures and videos to aid the audience in figuring out where she is, who her captor is, and why she was kidnapped.

Cast 
 Emmy Rossum as Christina Perasso
 Cooper Thornton as Federal Agent Stu MacArthur
 Molly Hagan as Mrs. Cathy Perasso
 Melissa Tang as Jennifer Myer
 Miranda Rae Mayo as Emma Hickox
 Jake Abel as Kirk Francis
 Hayley Chase as Lucca Scibird
 Xander Berkeley as H1ghway_man

References

External links 
 

2011 horror thriller films
American horror thriller films
Films directed by D. J. Caruso
Films scored by Brian Tyler
Intel
Internet films
Films about the Internet
Films about social media
Toshiba
Sponsored films
2010s English-language films
2010s American films